Jérémy Jouve (born 7 August 1979) is a French classical guitarist. He was one of six Frenchmen to win the Guitar Foundation of America International competition.

Biography 
Born in Échirolles (Auvergne-Rhône-Alpes), Jouve started playing guitar at the age of 7. A student at the National School of Music in Chambéry, he attended Daniel Herbelot's classes from 1987 to 1992. At the age of 10, he interpreted a concerto by Vivaldi as soloist with the Chambéry Orchestra.

Until 1994, he was a student at the Conservatory of Grenoble where he won the Gold Medal at 13, as well as the Prix de perfectionnement.

The young Jouve then followed the private lessons of Éric Franceries, whom he considers to be one of his strongest influences.

He later went to the École normale de musique de Paris to perfect his skill with Alberto Ponce, with whom he continued his guitar training at the Conservatoire de Paris until 2000. Roland Dyens then became his teacher. Jouve obtained the Diploma of Higher Formation, specialty guitar of the Conservatoire in 2001.

He decided to follow the class of the concertist László Hadady, solo oboist of the Ensemble Intercontemporain, and obtained his Diploma of Higher Education specialty in chamber music the following year. He was one of the rare guitarists to be received in perfection cycle, he continued his work with László Hadady until 2004.

Since 2003, his career has had an international outreach: from the 40-date tour, when he won the famous Guitar Foundation of America international competition, on stages abroad, Jouve registers as a new French guitar ambassador.

He performs on the greatest musical stages in the world: the Tchaikowsky Hall in Moscow, the Iserlohn Guitar Festival in Germany, the National Theatre and Concert Hall of Taipei in Taiwan, the Busan Cultural Center in South Korea, the Sha Tin Town Hall of Hong Kong, the music festival of Radio France in Montpellier, the guitar festival of Saltillo in Mexico, the concert hall of the Luis Ángel Arango Library in Bogota (Colombia), and other venues in Germany, India, Korea, China, Vietnam, Japan, Great Britain, Spain, United States.

A musician open to all styles, described as eager for musical encounters, he plays with accuracy, in a classical, contemporary repertoire, in chamber music as well as in solo music.

Jouve has collaborated with numerous musicians including:
 in chamber music with Gérard Abiton, Pierre Fouchenneret, Elsa Grether, Nicolas Jouve (his brother), Christophe Morin, Roland Dyens, Éric Franceries, Mathias Duplessy, Sébastien Droy and Prabhu Edouard.
 as soloist for concerto with the Taipei Symphony Orchestra and the State Academic Symphony Orchestra of the Russian Federation in Moscow.
 
He also performed with the Orchestre de l'Opéra national de Paris, the Orchestre de l'Opéra national de Lyon, the Sinfonietta ensemble and the Orchestre national d'Île-de-France.

Very committed, he collaborates closely with Mathias Duplessy for the composition of certain pieces for solo guitar. Notably during his last album Cavalcade, which received good media reviews.

His interpretation of Britten's Nocturnal is a reference, as is his interpretation of the work for solo guitar by Joaquín Rodrigo.

Since his first solo album in 2004, he has recorded five albums, two of which are dedicated to the solo guitar work of composer Joaquín Rodrigo.

The Traveling Sonata album, in duet with the flautist Viviana Guzmán brought him a nomination to the Grammy Awards.

At the same time as his tours and recordings, Jeremy Jouve has taught guitar since 2018 at the Conservatoire de musique de Genève and has been named professor at the Conservatoire à rayonnement régional de Paris in January 2020, succeeding to the great masters Gérard Abiton, Pedro Ibañez and Ramon de Herrera.

Awards 
Jouve has won several prizes including:
 First Prize of the GFA international competition, organised in Mexico in 2003.
 First Prize of the International Guitar Competition of Tychy in 2002.
 Gold Medal Award and Developmental Award in 1993.

In 2014, his album Traveling Sonata, a duet with flute, recorded at Skywalker Studio in San Francisco, was nominated to the Grammy Awards.

In 2015 his album Cavalcade joined the FIP official selection of April.

Discography 
2021: Jérémy Jouve & Friends play Mathias Duplessy Chamber Music - Totem
2015: Cavalcade - Absilone
2013: Traveling Sonata - Reference Recording
2013: Rodrigo, J.: Guitar Music, Vol. 2 - Naxos
2009: Jeremy Jouve - 2003 Winner of the International GFA Competition - Melbay
2008: Rodrigo, J.: Guitar Music, Vol. 1 - Naxos
2004: Jeremy Jouve Laureate Series - Naxos

References

External links 
 Official website
 GFA website

1979 births
Living people
People from Échirolles
French classical guitarists
French male guitarists
Conservatoire de Paris alumni
École Normale de Musique de Paris alumni
21st-century French musicians
21st-century guitarists
21st-century French male musicians